Metraleeswarar Temple (also called Kanchi Metrali) is a Hindu temple dedicated to Shiva, located in Pillaiyar Palayam area in  Kanchipuram, Kanchipuram district in Tamil Nadu, India. Metraleeswarar is revered in the 7th century Tamil Saiva canonical work, the Tevaram, written by Tamil saint poets known as the nayanars and classified as Paadal Petra Sthalam, the 275 temples revered in the canon. The temple is believed to have expanded during the 13th century by Later Cholas as indicated in the inscriptions.

The temple has four daily rituals at various times from 5:30 a.m. to 8 p.m., and three yearly festivals on its calendar, of which the Thirugnana Sambanda Gurupuja and Panguni Uthiram during March - April being the most prominent. The temple is maintained and administered by the Hindu Religious and Endowment Board of the Government of Tamil Nadu. The temple is counted among the many historic and religious places of Kanchipuram.

Etymology and legend

According to legend, saint Thirugnana Sambandar was singing verses praising Shiva at the nearby site and Shiva was mesmerized by the devotion. The temple deity thus came to be known as Urugeswarar (urugu means mesmerize in Tamil and the image of the Sambandar is located in Urugeswarar temple axially outside the temple facing the Metraleeswar temple with folded hands. As Shiva turned to the West to listen to the songs of Sambandar, the place came to be known as Thirumetrali and the presiding deity came to be known as Metralinathar. An old term  is 'Thali', which means temple.

There is another legend that Vishnu was doing penance to attain the form of Shiva. Shiva appeared to him and informed that he had to continue his penance till Sambandar visits the place and sings praise of him. The deity at the Urugeswarar temple was thus originally Vishnu, who was mesmerized by the devotion of Sambandar and changed to Shiva. It is believed that the 108 Rudras performed penance at this place and hence it is called "Ananda Rudresam" and "Maha Rudresam".

Appar and Sambandar, the 7th-century Tamil Saivite poet, venerated Metralinathar in one verse each in Tevaram, compiled as the First Tirumurai. As the temple is revered in Tevaram, it is classified as Paadal Petra Sthalam, one of the 275 temples that find mention in the Saiva canon. Sundarar mentions that Shiva prefers to reside at this most happening place. There are no historical evidence to assess the exact time the temple was built. There is an inscription in the temple indicating benevolent contributions from during the 13th century by Later Cholas to expand the temple.

Architecture

The temple is located in Pillayarpalayam area of Kanchipuram. Metraleeswarar temple complex has two prakarams (outer courtyard) and a three-tiered rajagopuram (gateway tower) facing West. The central shrine faces West and holds the image of Metraleeswarar (Shiva) in the form of lingam made of granite. The other shrine of Shiva following the legend of Vishnu called Otarukeesar, who is believed to have melted at the songs of Sambandar. The temples in Kanchipuram have no separate shrine of Parvathi as it is believed that Kamakshi of Kanchipuram is the common Parvathi shrine for all Shiva temples. But this temple has a separate shrine for Parvathi in the form of Metralinayagi. The granite images of Nandi (the bull and vehicle of Shiva) and the flagstaff is located axial to the sanctum. As in other Shiva temples of Tamil Nadu, the first precinct or the walls around the sanctum of Metraleeswarar has images of Dakshinamurthy (Shiva as the Teacher), Durga (warrior-goddess) and Chandikeswarar (a saint and devotee of Shiva). The shrine of Nataraja, the dancing form of Shiva, has only a printed image unlike other Shiva temples that house an idol of the deity. The temple precinct is surrounded by granite walls. There is a separate shrine for Othu Urugeeswarar which is axial to the main entrance. During the weekly and yearly festivals, Kachabeswarar is given importance over the presiding deity Metraleeswarar.

Worship and religious practices

The temple priests perform the puja (rituals) during festivals and on a daily basis. The temple rituals are performed four times a day; Kalasanthi at 8:00 a.m., Uchikalam at 12 p.m. and Sayarakshai at 6:00 p.m and Arthajamam at 8:00 p.m. Each ritual comprises four steps: abhisheka (sacred bath), alangaram (decoration), naivethanam (food offering) and deepa aradanai (waving of lamps) for both Metraleeswarar and Metralainayagi Amman. Thirugnana Sambanda Gurupuja and Panguni Uthiram during March - April are the most prominent festivals celebrated in the temple. The Thirukarthikai during (November - December), Mahashivarathri during February - March and Kanthasashti are the other major festivals celebrated in the temple.

References

External links

Padal Petra Stalam
Hindu temples in Kanchipuram